Gauer is a surname of German origin, originating as a topographic surname for someone from the country. Notable people with the surname include:

Charlie Gauer (1941-1973), American professional football player and assistant coach
George Gauer (1882-1992), American printer, real estate salesman, and politician

See also
Gauger
Gager (disambiguation)